Leonid "Leo" Radvinsky (born May 1982) is a Florida-based Ukrainian-American businessman, pornographer and computer programmer. He is the founder of the cam site MyFreeCams (through his holding company, Mfcxy, Inc.), and the majority owner of content subscription service OnlyFans.

Biography
Radvinsky was born in Odesa, Ukraine and his Jewish family later emigrated to Chicago when he was a child. In 2002, he graduated from Northwestern University with a degree in economics.

Radvinsky operates a venture capital fund called "Leo", founded in 2009, which invests mainly in tech companies. Notable investments include Israel-based B4X and software creator, Pleroma. Radvinsky is also a supporter of the  Elixir programming language.

In May 2021, The Guardian described him as a "US-based online pornography veteran who largely chooses to avoid the media." He donated $5 million to Ukraine relief in 2022 as well a cancer charity, an animal-welfare organization, and a skin-disorder-research fund.

Career

Early career
In 1999, when Radvinsky was 17 years old, he helped incorporate Cybertania Inc. During the late 1990s and early 2000s, Radvinsky developed more than ten websites such as Password Universe, Working Passes and Ultra Passwords that claimed and were advertised to provide users with "illegal" and "hacked" passwords to porn sites, where he earned money for every click. Ultra Passwords reportedly earned $1.8 million a year in revenue during the 2000s.

In 2004, he founded MyFreeCams, an adult streaming website. The same year, Microsoft sued Radvinsky for allegedly sending millions of deceptive emails to Hotmail users, but the case was eventually dismissed.

OnlyFans
In 2018, he bought a 75% stake in OnlyFans' parent company Fenix International Ltd. from its British founder Tim Stokely. After this, OnlyFans became increasingly focused on not safe for work (NSFW) content and "gained a pop culture reputation for being a hive of pornography". In a roughly two-year period from 2021 to 2022, Radvinsky received around $500million in dividends from the website.

References

External links
Official website (#1)
Official website (#2)
Leo.com (venture capital fund)

Living people
20th-century American Jews
Ukrainian Jews
Ukrainian emigrants to the United States
American company founders
American pornographers
American venture capitalists
American investors
Businesspeople from Chicago
Helicopter pilots
21st-century American Jews
1982 births